Na Sung-seung (Hangul: 나성승; born 28 August 1999) is a South Korean badminton player.

Achievements

Asian Junior Championships 
Boys' doubles

Mixed doubles

BWF World Tour 
The BWF World Tour, which was announced on 19 March 2017 and implemented in 2018, is a series of elite badminton tournaments sanctioned by the Badminton World Federation (BWF). The BWF World Tours are divided into levels of World Tour Finals, Super 1000, Super 750, Super 500, Super 300, and the BWF Tour Super 100.

Men's doubles

BWF International Challenge/Series (1 title) 
Men's doubles

  BWF International Challenge tournament
  BWF International Series tournament

References

External links 
 

1999 births
Living people
South Korean male badminton players